Ham Island is an inhabited man-made island of roughly 50 hectares (125 acres) in the River Thames in Old Windsor in England. It was a mature meander of the Thames until a channel was dug, the New Cut, to build Old Windsor Lock which reduced the navigable distance by two thirds.

The island contains 37 dwellings, a couple of which were abandoned during the 2014 flood.

History
The current island was a peninsula partly surrounded by a meander of the Thames until 1822 when the Thames Navigation Commissioners dug a channel of the river across the neck, the New Cut, to build Old Windsor Lock at its downstream end. At the upstream end a weir was constructed across the mainstream of the river, and at the downstream end of the cut the Old Windsor Lock also has a small weir. Accordingly, the distance in navigation was cut to around one third.

Inhabitation
The islands accommodates 37 privately owned dwellings. The original houses on the island, now almost entirely rebuilt in a more luxurious style, were quite modest - many were holiday homes. The island is also the site of a water treatment plant, well-screened from the homes, and the Blueacre Horse Rescue centre which had to be evacuated during the February 2014 flooding.

Literature
The island is referred to in Three Men in a Boat as, passing up through the lock at this point for the first time they note they can spy Windsor Castle in the distance. This trip is still facilitated with boat hire companies in riverside settlements such as Maidenhead, Windsor and Staines.

Protection
Part of the island is included within the Scheduled Ancient Monument, Kingsbury medieval palace and associated monuments.

During the early months of 2014 the island was flooded, and many residents decided to leave their homes.

See also
Islands in the River Thames

References

Bibliography 
The Ham Island Cookery Collection (Ed Noble,S) 1998 Old Windsor, H.I.R.A
Buildings of Old Windsor Gilson, M  Old Windsor, M.F. Gilson, 1995

Gallery

Islands of the River Thames